Skudge is a music duo from Stockholm, Sweden, producing techno music.

2011 they won the Sveriges Radio P3 Guld award (Sveriges Radio P3 is a public radio station in Sweden) within the category dance of the year. This prize is awarded at the P3 Gold Awards in January of each year to artists whose CDs were released over the past Swedish music year. The awards ceremony is broadcast in Swedish public service television and radio; the prize consists of a statuette of gold and broken glass, designed by Anton Gårdsäter.

Album 
 Phantom, Skudge Records 2010
 Balancing Point, Skudge Records 2016

Singles and EP 
 Depth Buffering EP (12", EP),	alphahouse 2009	
 Melodrama / Ontic, Skudge Records 2010	
 Instrumentals, Skudge Records	2010	
 Convolution / Contamination, Skudge Records 2010	
 Overture / Mirage, Skudge Records 2010	
 Skudge Remixes Part 2 (12", Ltd), Skudge Records 2010	
 Skudge Remixes Part 1 (12", Ltd), Skudge Records 2010	
 Skudge Remixes Part 3, Skudge Records 2010	
 Below / Phantom, Skudge Records 2010

References

External links 
 http://www.skudgerecords.com/

Swedish electronic music groups
Swedish musical duos